Acârash is an occult blackened heavy metal band from Oslo, Norway. The band combines elements of doom metal, black metal and 1970s hard rock. They are signed to Dark Essence Records. The members have past connections with Lonely Kamel and The Void

History 
The band was formed in the fall of 2016 by Valac, Lukas Paulsen, and Sølve Sæther. In the summer of 2017 they recorded their debut album In Chaos Becrowned and signed a deal with Dark Essence Records, the home of bands like Taake, Hades Almighty and Helheim.

The founding members of Acârash had a shared history from The Void, a Norwegian avant-garde hard rock band. The Void was the core of a fringe movement connected with the black metal and rock scene in and around Oslo in the early 1990s. The band briefly had members from Dimmu Borgir, Borknagard and Arcturus.

After the original members Sæther, Paulsen and Valac eventually laid The Void to rest, they proceeded on their own with bands like Lonely Kamel, Zection8, Faustus, Deep Rest  and TurnCoat.

The first Acârash single Cadaver Dei premiered on Metal Hammer on 26 April 2018.

Discography

Studio albums

Singles

Music videos

Members

Current members 
Valac – vocals, bass (2016–present)
Lukas Paulsen – guitars (2016–present)
Anders Gjelsvik – guitars (2018–present)
Sølve Sæther – drums (2018–present)

Previous members 
Jarle Bjerkely – guitars (2016)

Former live members 
André Kvebek – guitars (2018)
Kenneth Mellum – drums (2018–2019)

References

External links 

 
 Dark Essence Records

Norwegian black metal musical groups
Norwegian hard rock musical groups
Norwegian doom metal musical groups
Musical groups established in 2016
Musical groups from Oslo
2016 establishments in Norway
Norwegian heavy metal musical groups